Muravyevka is a rural locality (a selo) and the administrative center of Muravyevsky Selsoviet of Tambovsky District, Amur Oblast, Russia. The population was 480 as of 2018. There are 12 streets.

Geography 
Muravyevka is located on the Gilchin River, 53 km southwest of Tambovka (the district's administrative centre) by road. Rezunovka is the nearest rural locality.

References 

Rural localities in Tambovsky District, Amur Oblast